The Elbit Systems Skylark I and Skylark II are miniature UAVs developed by Elbit Systems. Initial models of the Skylark entered service in 2008.

Design and development

Skylark I
The Skylark I is a Miniature UAV. It is designed as a manpacked system for tactical surveillance and reconnaissance. The Skylark is launched by hand. The payload consists of a daylight CCD or optional FLIR for night operations. During operation, it sends real-time video to a portable ground station. Recovery involves a deep stall maneuver, landing on a small inflatable cushion. It has a range of 20/40 km.

The Skylark is in operation with the armed forces of Croatia, Czech Republic, Hungary, Israel, Macedonia, Myanmar, Netherlands, Poland, Slovakia, and Sweden. It has been deployed in Afghanistan and Iraq. The Skylark I has also been selected by France's special forces (Commando Parachutiste de l'Air n° 10) in March 2008. Previous operators who have now retired the system include Australia and Canada. In total, it has been selected by more than 20 operators worldwide.

Skylark II
The Skylark II was unveiled in 2006. It has a range of 60 km and is designed to be operated by a two-person crew and to be deployed using HMMWV-class field vehicles. In December 2007, South Korea decided to purchase the Skylark II system. Israel planned to bring the Skylark II into service by mid-2013.

Skylark 3
In February 2016, Elbit Systems unveiled the Skylark 3 unmanned air system, revealing it had already gained selection by an undisclosed customer. The Skylark 3 is intended to support brigade and division-level units, having a 4.8 m (15.7 ft) wingspan and a maximum take-off weight of 45 kg (99 lb) with a  payload. Two air vehicles can be operated simultaneously using a shared ground control station.

Operational history

The Skylark entered operational service in 2008, and began being used in large quantities for high-tempo support of ground forces during Operation Protective Edge which began on 8 July 2014.  Every active and reserve brigade received at least two air vehicles and flew them continuously, sometimes both vehicles at the same time.  By August 12, some 18 systems had flown several hundred hours, generating intelligence and streaming target-acquisition data to soldiers on the ground.

On 21 December 2014, Syrian sources claimed a Skylark UAV crashed in Quneitra  Governorate during a reconnaissance mission; however, the Israel Defense Forces (IDF) said that they had no knowledge of an UAV in that area at the time. It was not clear if the UAV had crashed or was shot down but photos of the drone were released later.

On 12 August 2015, Al-Qassam Brigades of Hamas claimed that they had captured a Skylark I and reused it for their own missions. The drone was captured on 22 July 2015 by one of their special commando units, and technically checked to make sure it was not booby-trapped.

On 20 March 2017, the Syrian Defense Ministry claimed a Skylark had been shot down and captured on the outskirts of Quneitra. The drone went down due to human error by the troops who were flying it, IDF officials said.

Operators

Current operators
 
 
 
 
 
 
 
 
 
 
 : One Skylark I-LEX UAV of Myanmar Army captured by rebels in early 2020.

Former operators
  Systems now retired and replaced by AeroVironment Wasp III
  Systems now retired and replaced by AeroVironment RQ-11 Raven

Specifications

Skylark I
Man Packed Hand Launched Over the Hill Mini UAV
 Type: Mini Unmanned Aerial System
 Length: 
 Wingspan: 
 Take-off Weight: 
 Service Ceiling: 
 Speed: 
 Mission radius: 
 Endurance: 2 hours

Skylark I-LEX
Skylark I-LEX is a new generation, man-portable, electric-propelled, mini unmanned aerial system (UAS).
 Type: Mini Unmanned Aerial System
 Take-off Weight: 
 Payload Weight: 
 Service Ceiling: 
 Range: 
 Endurance: 3 hours

Skylark C
Skylark C is a shipborne mini UAS designed for patrol boats and small vessel operations.
 Type: Mini UAS For Tactical Naval and Maritime Applications
 Take-off Weight: 
 Service Ceiling: 
 Range: 
 Endurance: 5 hours

Skylark II UAV
The Skylark II is a close-range tactical unmanned aerial vehicle (UAV) system.
 Type: Unmanned Aerial Vehicle
 Wingspan: 
 Maximum take-off weight: 
 Maximum payload weight: 
 Powerplant: 1 × 4 kW (5 hp) electrical motor
 Maximum endurance: 6 hours
 Service ceiling: 4,572 m
 Maximum altitude: 16,000 ft
 Maximum range:

Skylark 3
Skylark 3 is a tactical mini UAV system (UAS) optimized for both dismounted and vehicle-based operation
 Type: Unmanned Aerial Vehicle
 Wingspan: 
 Maximum take-off weight: 
 Maximum endurance: 5 hours
 Maximum altitude: 
 Maximum range:

Skylark 3 Hybrid
Skylark 3 Hybrid is a Long Endurance Tactical Mini UAS
 Type: Unmanned Aerial Vehicle
 Wingspan: 
 Maximum take-off weight: 
 Maximum endurance: 18 hours
 Maximum altitude: 
 Maximum range: 
 Propulsion: hybrid propulsion system, electric and internal combustion

See also

 MicroFalcon

References

External links

 
 

Elbit unmanned aerial vehicles